Bobby Martin (May 4, 1930 – September 6, 2013) was an American music producer, arranger and songwriter, closely associated with Philadelphia International Records and Philly soul. He is best known for his arrangement of Billy Paul's "Me and Mrs. Jones", his work on the Soul Train theme, and with artists including Whitney Houston, L.T.D., MFSB, Patti LaBelle, Frank Zappa, Lou Rawls, Lesley Gore, The Manhattans, The O'Jays, The Jacksons, Dusty Springfield and the Bee Gees, among others.

Martin received a Grammy Award for Album of the Year for his contribution to the Saturday Night Fever soundtrack.

He died in 2013.

References

External links

1930 births
2013 deaths
Record producers from California
African-American record producers
American music arrangers
Grammy Award winners
Musicians from Ohio
Songwriters from Ohio
People from Lockland, Ohio
20th-century African-American people
21st-century African-American people